Vanchi Maniyachchi Junction railway station is a junction railway station in Maniyachchi of Thoothukudi district in the Indian state of Tamil Nadu. Services from north of the station pass through the station to proceed southwards to Tirunelveli and eastwards to Thoothukudi, as these branchings make the station, a junction.

History 
The station is named after the Tamil freedom fighter Vanchinathan and was the site of assassination of the British Collector, Robert Ashe. Today the station is a significant station in the Madurai railway division of the Southern Railway Zone, one of the six divisions established within the Southern Railway zone others being Chennai, Tiruchchirappalli, Salem, Palakkad and Thiruvananthapuram.

Location and Layout 

Lines 
The station has 3 intersecting lines:
 BG single line towards the north via .
 BG single line towards the south via .

Traffic 
Being the junction at which the line bifurcates to the port city of Thoothukudi, the station has a fair share of train stoppage. All the passenger trains, most express trains and a few longer distance superfast trains stop here.

References

External links 
 

Madurai railway division
Railway stations in Thoothukudi district
Railway junction stations in Tamil Nadu